The History of the Countess of Dellwyn is a 1759 novel by Sarah Fielding. It has also been published as The Countess of Dellwyn.

Publication history
The History of the Countess of Dellwyn was published on 28 March 1759. Andrew Millar, the text's publisher, paid Fielding sixty guineas for 1,000 copies of the first edition, with an agreement for an additional forty guineas if demand warranted a second edition. Samuel Richardson is responsible for the novel's printing, which cost six shillings. Within that year, a Dublin edition and a serialized version of Mrs. Bilson's story were put on the market. A German translation followed in 1761. However, a second edition was never printed.

Plot

List of characters

Critical context

Unlike Fielding's The Adventures of David Simple (1744), The History of the Countess of Dellwyn, her penultimate novel, has only recently begun to receive sustained scholarly attention. In part, this critical neglect has developed in response to the novel's status as what Linda Bree calls a "problem text" that exemplifies "the tension that inevitably arises between moral and theoretical certitudes on the one hand and the ambiguities and ambivalences of experience on the other".

References

Further reading
Gadaken, Sara. “Managing and Marketing Virtue in Sarah Fielding’s History of the Countess of Dellwyn.” Eighteenth-Century Fiction 15.1 (2002): 19-34.
Rumbold, Kate. “Shakespeare’s ‘Propriety’ and the Mid-Eighteenth-Century Novel: Sarah Fielding’s The History of the Countess of Dellwyn.” Reading 1759: Literary Culture in Mid-Eighteenth-Century Britain and France. Ed. Shaun Regan. Lewisburg: Bucknell, 2013. pp 187–205.

1759 novels
18th-century British novels
Novels about nobility